Chortomlyk is an urban-type settlement in Nikopol Raion of Dnipropetrovsk Oblast in Ukraine. It is located on the right bank of the Dnieper (Kakhovka Reservoir), south of Pokrov and west of Nikopol. Chortomlyk belongs to Pokrov urban hromada, one of the hromadas of Ukraine. Population: 

Until 18 July 2020, Chortomlyk belonged to Pokrov Municipality, the administrative division subordinated to the city of oblast significance of Pokrov. The municipality was abolished in July 2020 as part of the administrative reform of Ukraine, which reduced the number of raions of Dnipropetrovsk Oblast to seven. The area of Pokrov Municipality was merged into Nikopol Raion.

Economy

Transportation
There is a railway station in Chortomlyk, on the railway connecting Zaporizhzhia with Kryvyi Rih. There is regular passenger traffic.

Chortomlyk is on Highway H23 which connects Zaporizhzhia and Kryvyi Rih.

References

Urban-type settlements in Nikopol Raion